Nevada Smith is a 1966 American Western film directed by Henry Hathaway and starring Steve McQueen, Karl Malden, Brian Keith, Arthur Kennedy and Suzanne Pleshette. The film was made by Embassy Pictures and Solar Productions, in association with and released by Paramount Pictures. The movie was a prequel to the 1961 Harold Robbins novel The Carpetbaggers, which had been made into a highly successful film two years earlier, with Alan Ladd playing McQueen's part as an older man. Nevada Smith depicts Smith's first meeting with another "Carpetbaggers" character, Jonas Cord Sr., and delves into Nevada Smith's background as summarized in a scene from the original film.

Plot
In the 1890s American West, outlaws Bill Bowdre, Jesse Coe, and Tom Fitch seek to rob Max's father of gold which they believe he has. When it becomes evident that there is none, they torture and brutally kill the white father and Kiowa mother of young Max Sand. Max sets out to avenge their deaths.

While traveling in the desert, Max uncovers a rusty old gun. Coming upon Jonas Cord, a traveling gunsmith, Max tries to rob him. Cord, recognizing that Max's revolver is non-functional, convinces Max he has failed. Max tells Cord about his vengeful journey. Cord, empathetic, shelters him and teaches him to shoot. Max hunts the killers, who have since separated. He tracks down Jesse Coe to Abilene, Texas. With help from Neesa, a Kiowa dance hall girl, he identifies and confronts Coe in a saloon. A knife fight ensues in a nearby corral. Coe is killed but Max is severely wounded. Neesa takes him to her tribe's camp and nurses him back to health. Soon after, they become lovers.

Once recovered, Max continues his pursuit. He learns that Bowdre is in a prison camp located deep within Louisiana's swamps. Max deliberately commits a bank robbery to be sent to the same prison as Bowdre. Max persuades Bowdre to escape with him, planning to kill him in the swamp. Pilar, a local Cajun girl working in the rice fields near the convicts’ camp agrees to help Max. Unaware of Max's plan to kill Bowdre, she obtains a boat and navigates the trio through the swamp. The boat capsizes early on and Pilar is bitten by a poisonous snake. Max kills Bowdre, but Pilar eventually succumbs to the venom of the snakebite.

Max has escaped and is now hunting Fitch, the last murderer. Still blinded by revenge, Max infiltrates Fitch's gang, calling himself, "Nevada Smith". Fitch knows Max Sand has killed Coe and Bowdre and is coming for him. Though he accepts "Nevada" into the gang, Fitch is wary. As the gang rides out to commit a gold-transport robbery, Max is spotted by Cord, who calls out his name. Max ignores him and the gang rides on. Fitch now suspects one of his men is Max. As the gang greedily scoops up the stolen gold, Max watches from a hill. Fitch, realizing "Smith" is Sand, grabs his share and flees. Max pursues him and corners him at a creek. Fitch tries shooting Sand while pretending to surrender, but Sand, faster, shoots Fitch's hand.

Fitch gives up and wants Max to quickly kill him. Max shoots Fitch several more times, inflicting painful but non-fatal wounds. As Fitch lies in the creek, bleeding profusely, Max demands Fitch beg for his life. Fitch calls Max a coward for refusing to kill him. Max decides Fitch is not worth killing and rides away as Fitch continues shouting at Max to kill him.

Cast

 Steve McQueen as Max Sand, a.k.a. Nevada Smith
 Karl Malden as Tom Fitch
 Brian Keith as Jonas Cord
 Arthur Kennedy as Bill Bowdre
 Suzanne Pleshette as Pilar
 Raf Vallone as Father Zaccardi
 Janet Margolin as Neesa
 Pat Hingle as Big Foot 
 Howard Da Silva as Warden
 Martin Landau as Jesse Coe
 Paul Fix as Sheriff Bonnell
 Gene Evans as Sam Sand
 Josephine Hutchinson as Mrs. Elvira McCanles
 John Doucette as Uncle Ben McCanles
 Val Avery as Buck Mason
 Sheldon Allman as Sheriff
 Lyle Bettger as Jack Rudabough
 Bert Freed as Quince
 David McLean as Romero
 Steve Mitchell as Buckshot
 Merritt Bohn as Riverboat Pilot
 Sandy Kenyon as Bank Clerk
 Ric Roman as Cipriano
 John Lawrence as Hogg
 Stanley Adams as Storekeeper
 George Mitchell as Paymaster
 John Litel as Doctor
 Ted de Corsia as Hudson (Bartender)
 Joanna Moore as Angie Cole

Production 
The movie was produced and directed by Henry Hathaway with Joseph E. Levine as executive producer, from a story and screenplay by John Michael Hayes, based on a character from Harold Robbins' 1961 novel The Carpetbaggers portrayed by Alan Ladd in the film adaptation of the novel. The music score was by Alfred Newman and the cinematography, shot in Eastmancolor and Panavision, by Lucien Ballard.

Nevada Smith was shot on approximately 46 different locations in the Inyo National Forest (in parts of southern California and southwestern Nevada) and the Owens Valley (of southern California) in the Eastern Sierra mountains.

See also
List of American films of 1966

References

External links
 
 
 
 
 

1966 films
1966 Western (genre) films
American Western (genre) films
Paramount Pictures films
1960s English-language films
Films scored by Alfred Newman
American films about revenge
Films based on American novels
Films directed by Henry Hathaway
Films with screenplays by John Michael Hayes
Revisionist Western (genre) films
1960s American films